Bernard Francis Morgan (August 12, 1858 – January 26, 1922) was a member of the South Dakota Senate.

Biography
B.F. Morgan was born on August 12, 1858, in Seymour, Wisconsin. He was married to Margaret McComish. Morgan died on January 26, 1922, in Wagner, Wisconsin.

Career
Morgan was elected mayor of Shullsburg, Wisconsin, in 1894. He was a member of the South Dakota Senate from 1911 to 1914. Additionally, he was a delegate to the 1916 Democratic National Convention.

References

People from Seymour, Wisconsin
Democratic Party South Dakota state senators
1858 births
1922 deaths